Brandon Dickerson is an American writer, director, and producer whose work includes film, music video, documentary film, and television commercials. He made his feature film directorial debut with the 2011 feature film Sironia, which won the Audience Award at the 2011 Austin Film Festival in October 2011 before its release through Filmbuff. His second feature film as writer-director, Victor, is set for release in 2017 as is his documentary film A Single Frame.

His most notable music videos include work for The Jonas Brothers, Demi Lovato, Selena Gomez, Switchfoot, Sixpence None the Richer, Bridgit Mendler, Dishwalla, China Anne McClain, Zendaya, Steven Curtis Chapman, Vince Gill, Michael W. Smith, Jeremy Camp, Toby Mac, and Elissa.

As a commercial director, Dickerson has worked with companies like Aprilia, Autodesk, Sony PlayStation, Sega, Yahoo!, Kinder Chocolate, The Walt Disney Company, and Partnership for Drug-Free Kids. In 2000, he won the Gold Lion award at the Cannes Lions International Festival of Creativity. Dickerson is signed with kaboom productions for commercials and music videos.

Awards
 Cannes Lions International Advertising Festival, Gold Lion
 Billboard Music Video Awards nominee (6 nominations)
 GMA Dove Award, Music Video of the Year
 Clio Awards, Bronze Clio Awards
 D&AD Award, Silver Pencil
 Association of Independent Commercial Producers (AICP) Award
 AUDIENCE AWARD, (Sironia  2011 Austin Film Festival)
 AUDIENCE AWARD, (A SINGLE FRAME, 2016 Austin Film Festivall)

Selected music video filmography
 "Somebody" – Cast of Lemonade Mouth
 "One and the Same" – Selena Gomez and Demi Lovato
 "It's On" – Cast of Camp Rock 2: The Final Jam
 "Somebody" – Bridgit Mendler
 "Breathe Your Name" – Sixpence None the Richer
 "This Is Home" – Switchfoot
 "Awakening" Switchfoot
 "When You Wish Upon a Star" – Meaghan Martin
 "Three Is a Magic Number" – Mitchel Musso
 "Remembering You" – Steven Curtis Chapman
 “Move” – Thousand Foot Krutch
 “Dreamer” – Bethany Dillon
 “Gone” – TobyMac
 “Anytime You Need a Friend” – The Beu Sisters
 “Do Ya" – Jump5
 “Next Big Thing” – Vince Gill
 “He reigns” Newsboys
 “All I Can Do” Jump5
 “Somewhere in the Middle” – Dishwalla
 “You Already Take Me There” – Switchfoot
 “Superman” – Luna Halo
 “Written on My Heart” – Plus One
 “Live for You” – Rachael Lampa
 “Escape from Reason" – Supertones
 “Last Goodbye” – Kenny Wayne Shepherd
 “A Little More” – Jennifer Knapp
 “Love Liberty Disco” – Newsboys
 “This Is Your Time” – Michael W. Smith
 "There She Goes" – Sixpence None the Richer
 “Free” – Montrel Darrett
 “Gravity” – Delirious?
 “Thicker” – Chasing Furies
 “New Way to Be Human” – Switchfoot
 “There Is Only You” – Smalltown Poets
 “Thicker” – Chasing Furies
 “In My Shoes” – Polarboy
 “Butterfly” – Seven Day Jesus
 “The Devil is Bad” – The W's
 “Ms. Innocence” – Wilshire
 “A Flowery Song” – Five Iron Frenzy
 “Nervous” – Dryve
 “As Long As There Is Christmas” – Play
 “Pure Fun” – Sabrina Bryan
 "Bastanak" – Elissa
 "Erga' Le Shou" – Elissa
 “Better In Stereo” - Dove Cameron

Television 
 J.O.N.A.S. (opening sequence Season 2)

Films 
 Sironia (writer-director)
 VICTOR (writer-director)
 A SINGLE FRAME (director)
 BENJAMIN DOVE (writer+director) in development
 CALL + RESPONSE (director of film sequences + artist performances)

References

External links
 official site
 BOOM Music videos official site
 kaboom productions official site

 Studio Daily interview
 https://austinfilmfestival.com/news/hiscox-filmmaker-blog-single-frame/

American film directors
Place of birth missing (living people)
Year of birth missing (living people)
American music video directors
Living people